Maurice Herrold (25 June 1869 – 26 August 1949) was a New Zealand rugby union player.

Biography 
Born in India to English parents, Herrold arrived with his family in New Zealand in 1880. He was educated at Napier Boys' High School and then Auckland Grammar School. A halfback, Herrold eight times represented Auckland at a provincial level including two matches against touring 1888 British Lions. He was a member of the New Zealand national side on their 1893 tour to Australia. Troubled by injury he played two matches on the tour, but did not appear in any of the major games against New South Wales or Queensland.

References

1869 births
1949 deaths
People from British India
English emigrants to New Zealand
People educated at Auckland Grammar School
People educated at Napier Boys' High School
New Zealand rugby union players
New Zealand international rugby union players
Hawke's Bay rugby union players
Auckland rugby union players
Rugby union scrum-halves
Sportspeople from Kolkata